Plectranthias jothyi is a species of ray-finned fish within the family Serranidae. It is native to the Indo-Pacific Ocean off Malaysia, living in pelagic waters 180 to 400 meters below sea level. It grows to a length of 9.2 centimeters.

References 

Fish of Indonesia
Fish described in 1996
Taxa named by John Ernest Randall
jothyi